Theroteinus is an extinct genus of haramiyidan mammaliaforms from the Late Triassic of France and Britain. It contains three species: T. nikolai, T. rosieriensis and T. jenkinsi, the former two of which are known exclusively from teeth found at the sand quarry of Saint-Nicolas-de-Port, while T. jenkinsi is known from a bedded sequence belonging to the Westbury Formation in a road cutting near Holwell, Dorset. Theroteinus is the only member of the family Theroteinidae and the suborder Theroteinida.

References

Haramiyida
Prehistoric cynodont genera
Late Triassic synapsids of Europe
Triassic England
Triassic France
Fossil taxa described in 1986
Taxa named by Denise Sigogneau‐Russell